Adam Rapp (born June 15, 1968) is an American novelist, playwright, screenwriter, musician and film director. His play Red Light Winter was a Pulitzer Prize finalist in 2006.

Early life
Rapp was born in Chicago to Mary Lee (née Baird; died 1997) and Douglas Rapp, and spent most of his youth in Joliet, Illinois.

He is a graduate of St. John's Military Academy (Delafield, Wisconsin) and Clarke College (Dubuque, Iowa). At Clarke, he captained the varsity basketball team.

After college he moved to New York City's East Village, where he landed a day job in book publishing and wrote fiction and plays at night. He later completed a two-year playwriting fellowship at Juilliard School. His younger brother is actor-singer Anthony Rapp.

Career

Plays
Rapp attended the O'Neill Playwrights Conference in 1996. His play Finer Noble Gases was staged by the Eugene O'Neill Theatre in 2000, by Actors Theatre of Louisville in 2001, by Carolina Actors Studio Theatre in Charlotte in 2003, and by Rattlestick Playwrights Theater in New York City in 2004. In 2001, Nocturne was premiered by the New York Theatre Workshop.  It has also been staged at by American Repertory Theater and Berkeley Repertory Theatre. His play Stone Cold Dead Serious was produced in 2002 by the American Repertory Theater.

His play Red Light Winter received the Joseph Jefferson Award (Best New Work) in 2005 for its production at Steppenwolf Theatre Company. The play ran Off-Broadway at the Barrow Street Theatre from January 20, 2006 to June 25, 2006, directed by Rapp. The play was nominated for the 2006 Lucille Lortel Award, Outstanding Play, and Rapp received the 2006 Obie Award, Special Citation. The play was a finalist for the Pulitzer Prize for Drama in 2006.

Rapp directed a production of Los Angeles, by Julian Sheppard, in 2007 at the Flea Theatre. In 2011, Rapp's The Metal Children was given its regional debut by Swine Palace on Louisiana State University's campus.

He has said that the Edge Theater Company in New York City is his "artistic home": "Edge Theater changed my life back in 2003. They are my family."

He made his Broadway debut with his play The Sound Inside, which began playing at Studio 54 starting on September 14, 2019 (opening officially on October 17, 2019) starring Mary-Louise Parker. The play premiered at the Williamstown Theatre Festival in 2018. The play was nominated for the Tony Award for Best Play at the 74th Tony Awards.

Teaching
He has taught at the Yale School of Drama.

Style
The majority of Rapp's plays feature small casts and are set in small spaces. Many characters in the plays are working class Americans. His plays often combine stories of Midwestern longing with the idea of finding escape in New York. He combines humor with gloom, preferring dark themes

In a conversation with fellow playwright Gina Gionfriddo published in The Brooklyn Rail, Rapp says: "When you see something powerfully acted on stage, it hits a nerve in the way music hits a nerve … Watching someone twelve feet from you falling in love or being abused … There’s something raw about that experience that you don’t get from film or TV."

Novels
Rapp's first young adult novel, Missing the Piano, was published in 1994.  After writing his second book, The Buffalo Tree, which was published in 1997, Rapp was invited to be the first author in residence at Ridgewood High School. The Buffalo Tree was censored by the Muhlenberg School Board in Reading, Pennsylvania due to its themes, graphic language and sexual content. His 2003 novel 33 Snowfish was one of Young Adult Library Services Association's Top Ten Best Books for Young Adults.  He released Under the Wolf, Under the Dog in 2004.

His first adult novel, The Year of Endless Sorrows, was released in 2006. Rapp made his graphic novel debut with the release of Ball Peen Hammer in September 2009. His second graphic novel, Decelerate Blue was published in February 2017.

Film, television and music
Rapp directed his first film, Winter Passing with Zooey Deschanel and Will Ferrell (2005), and was a creative consultant for the television show The L Word.

While working on The L Word, Rapp left in the middle of the season to attend the Edinburgh Festival, where he directed his play, Finer Noble Gases, which won the Fringe First Award. He wrote for the 2010 season of HBO's In Treatment.

He was a member of the band Bottomside, which released the independent CD The Element Man in September 2004. He is a member of "Less the Band", which released the album Bear in April 2006.

In 2021, he co-wrote the pilot episode “Cold Snap” for the Showtime special event series Dexter: New Blood.

List of works

Plays
 Dreams of the Salthorse (2000)
 Nocturne (2000)
 Animals and Plants (2001)
 Train Story (short play, 2001)
 Finer Noble Gases (2002)
 Faster (2002)
 Trueblinka (2002)
 Stone Cold Dead Serious (2003)
 Blackbird (2004)
 Gompers (2004)
 Members Only (short play, 2005)
 Red Light Winter (2005)
 Essential Self-Defense (2006)
 Bingo with the Indians (2007)
 American Sligo  (2008)
 Kindness (2008)
 Classic Kitchen Timer (short play, 2009)
 The Metal Children (2010)
 Ghosts in the Cottonwoods (2011)
 The Hallway Trilogy (2011), Part One: Rose, Part Two: Paraffin, Part Three: Nursing
 The Edge of Our Bodies (2011)
 Dreams of Flying Dreams of Falling (2011)
 Through the Yellow Hour (2012)
 Wolf in the River (2016)
 The Purple Lights of Joppa Illinois (2016)
 The Sound Inside (2018)

Novels
 The Year of Endless Sorrows (2006)
 Know Your Beholder (2015)

Young adult novels
 Missing the Piano (1994)
 The Buffalo Tree (1997)
 The Copper Elephant (1999)
 Little Chicago (2002)
 33 Snowfish (2003)
 Under the Wolf, Under the Dog (2004) (2006 Schneider Family Teen Award Winner)
 Punkzilla (2009) (2010 Michael L. Printz Award Honor Book)
 The Children and the Wolves (2012)
 Decelerate Blue (2017)
 Fum (2018)

Screenwriter
 The Jury (2004)
 Winter Passing (2005)
 The L Word (2006)
 Blackbird (2007)
 In Treatment (2010)
 Flesh and Bone (2015)
 Vinyl (2016)
 The Looming Tower (2018)

Film director
 Winter Passing (2005)
 Blackbird (2007)
 Loitering with Intent (2014)

Awards
Source: Gale

References

External links

Adam Rapp at The Playwrights Database (doollee.com) 
 "The Playwright" panel discussion, Working in the Theatre, CUNY-TV/American Theatre Wing (December 2006 audio-video)
 Email interview by ALAN, The ALAN Review 28.1 (Fall 2000)
 

1968 births
Living people
20th-century American novelists
21st-century American novelists
American male novelists
Juilliard School alumni
Clarke Pride men's basketball players
Musicians from Joliet, Illinois
Princess Grace Awards winners
Writers from Joliet, Illinois
Film directors from Illinois
20th-century American dramatists and playwrights
American male dramatists and playwrights
21st-century American dramatists and playwrights
20th-century American male writers
21st-century American male writers
Novelists from Illinois
Yale School of Drama faculty